Darwinellidae is a family of sponges in the order Dendroceratida.

Species

 Genus Aplysilla Schulze, 1878 
 Aplysilla arctica Laubenfels, 1948
 Aplysilla glacialis (Merejkowski, 1877)
 Aplysilla lacunosa Keller, 1889
 Aplysilla lendenfeldi Thiele, 1905
 Aplysilla longispina George & Wilson, 1919
 Aplysilla pallida Lendenfeld, 1889
 Aplysilla polyraphis de Laubenfels, 1930
 Aplysilla rosea (Barrois, 1876)
 Aplysilla rubra (Hanitsch, 1890)
 Aplysilla sulfurea Schulze, 1878
 Genus Armodendrilla Van Soest & Hooper, 2020 
 Armodendrilla bergquistae Van Soest & Hooper, 2020
 Genus Chelonaplysilla Laubenfels, 1948 
 Chelonaplysilla americana van Soest, 2017
 Chelonaplysilla arenosa (Topsent, 1925)
 Chelonaplysilla aurea Bergquist, 1995
 Chelonaplysilla betinensis Zea & van Soest, 1986
 Chelonaplysilla delicata Pulitzer-Finali & Pronzato, 1999
 Chelonaplysilla erecta (Row 1911)
 Chelonaplysilla incrustans (Carter, 1876)
 Chelonaplysilla noevus (Carter, 1876)
 Chelonaplysilla psammophila (Topsent, 1928)
 Chelonaplysilla supjiensis Jeon & Sim, 2008
 Chelonaplysilla violacea (Lendenfeld 1883)
 Genus Darwinella Müller, 1865
 Darwinella australiensis Carter, 1885
 Darwinella corneostellata (Carter, 1872)
 Darwinella dalmatica Topsent, 1905
 Darwinella duplex Topsent, 1905
 Darwinella gardineri Topsent 1905
 Darwinella intermedia Topsent, 1893
 Darwinella muelleri (Schultze, 1865)
 Darwinella oxeata Bergquist 1961
 Darwinella rosacea Hechtel, 1965
 Darwinella simplex Topsent, 1892
 Darwinella tango (Poiner & Taylor, 1990)
 Darwinella viscosa Boury-Esnault, 1971
 Darwinella warreni Topsent, 1905
 Genus Dendrilla Lendenfeld, 1883
 Dendrilla acantha Vacelet, 1958
 Dendrilla antarctica Topsent, 1905
 Dendrilla cactos (Selenka, 1867)
 Dendrilla camera (de Laubenfels, 1936)
 Dendrilla cirsioides Topsent, 1893
 Dendrilla cruor (Carter, 1886)
 Dendrilla lendenfeldi Hentschel, 1912
 Dendrilla membranosa (Pallas, 1766)
 Dendrilla mertoni Hentschel, 1912
 Dendrilla rosea Lendenfeld, 1883

References

 
Dendroceratida
Sponge families